Cirsium clavatum, the Fish Lake thistle or fringed thistle, is a North American species of plants in the tribe Cardueae within the family Asteraceae.  The species is native to the western United States, the States of Wyoming, Colorado, Utah, Arizona, and New Mexico.

Cirsium clavatum is a biennial or perennial herb up to 100 cm (40 inches) tall, blooming only once before dying. Leaves have thin spines along the edge, much smaller than those of related species. There are several to many flower heads, with white or pale pink disc florets but no ray florets.

Varieties
 Cirsium clavatum var. americanum (A.Gray) D.J.Keil - Colorado, Utah, Wyoming
 Cirsium clavatum var. clavatum  - Colorado, Utah
 Cirsium clavatum var. osterhoutii (Rydb.) D.J.Keil - Colorado

References

External links

clavatum
Flora of the Western United States
Plants described in 1895
Flora without expected TNC conservation status